Canada competed at the 1932 Winter Olympics in Lake Placid, United States. Canada has competed at every Winter Olympic Games.

W. A. Hewitt served as chairman of the winter games sub-committee of the Canadian Olympic Committee. Melville Marks Robinson served as manager of the Canadian delegation to the Olympics, with Claude C. Robinson as the honorary assistant manager.

Canadian Olympic Committee member W. A. Fry self-published a book covering Canadian achievements at the 1932 Winter Olympics and 1932 Summer Olympics. His 1933 book, Canada at the tenth Olympiad, 1932 : Lake Placid, New York, Feb. 4 to 13 - Los Angeles, California, July 30 to Aug. 14, was printed by the Dunnville Chronicle presses and dedicated to Canadian sportsperson Francis Nelson who died in 1932.

Medalists

Cross-country skiing

Men

Figure skating

Men

Women

Pairs

Ice hockey

The Canadian Olympic Committee selected the Winnipeg Hockey Club as the 1931 Allan Cup champions to represent Canada. Claude C. Robinson was chosen to oversee finances for the team, while W. A. Hewitt was named honorary manager. After the Winnipeg Hockey Club won the gold medal at the Olympics, Hewitt sought for future Canadian national teams at the Olympics to be the reigning Allan Cup champion team, strengthened with six additional players.

Top scorer

Nordic combined 

Events:
 18 km cross-country skiing
 normal hill ski jumping

The cross-country skiing part of this event was combined with the main medal event of cross-country skiing. Those results can be found above in this article in the cross-country skiing section. Some athletes (but not all) entered in both the cross-country skiing and Nordic combined event, their time on the 18 km was used for both events.

The ski jumping (normal hill) event was held separate from the main medal event of ski jumping, results can be found in the table below.

Ski jumping

Speed skating

Men

References

Sources

 Olympic Winter Games 1932, full results by sports-reference.com

Nations at the 1932 Winter Olympics
1932
Olympics, Winter